Twelve teams are scheduled to compete in the women's Olympic football tournament .

Table
{| class="wikitable"
|-
!Means of qualification
!Dates
!Venue(s)
!Berth(s)
!Qualified
|-
|Host nation
|
|
|align=center|1
|
|-
|2018 Copa América
|4–22 April 2018
|
|align=center|1
|
|-
|2018 OFC Nations Cup
|18 November – 1 December 2018
|
|align=center|1
| 
|-
|2019 FIFA Women's World Cup(as UEFA qualifying)
|7 June – 7 July 2019
|
|align=center|3
|
|-
|2020 CONCACAF Olympic Qualifying Championship
|28 January – 9 February 2020
|
|align=center|2
|
|-
|2020 CAF Olympic Qualifying Tournament
|5–10 March 2020
|
|align=center|1
|
|-
|2020 AFC Olympic Qualifying Tournament
|6–11 March 2020 & 8–13 April 2021
|
|align=center|2
|
|-
|CAF–CONMEBOL play-off
|10–13 April 2021
|
|align=center|1
|
|-
!Total
!
!colspan=1| 
!12
! 
|}

Dates and venues are those of final tournaments (or final round of qualification tournaments), various qualification stages may precede matches at these specific venues.

2018 Copa América

Brazil earned an Olympic qualification place by winning the Copa América. Chile advanced to the playoff round against Cameroon, the second-place team from the CAF qualifying tournament.

Qualified teams
All ten CONMEBOL member national teams entered the tournament.

First stage

Group A

Group B

Final stage

2018 OFC Nations Cup

New Zealand earned an Olympic qualification place by winning the Nations Cup.

Qualified teams

All 11 OFC member national teams entered the tournament. The top seven ranked teams advanced to the final automatically, with the remaining four competing in a qualification stage for the final place. 
Tahiti and New Caledonia, as French administrative divisions, were not eligible to compete at the Women's Olympic Football Tournament.

Group stage

Group A

Group B

Final stage

UEFA qualification through the 2019 FIFA Women's World Cup

Nine teams from UEFA competed at the World Cup, with the three best-placed European teams earning an Olympic qualification place. Three UEFA teams reached the semi-finals of the World Cup, which earned an Olympic qualification place for Great Britain (through England's performance), the Netherlands and Sweden, with Sweden eliminating reigning Olympic champions Germany.

Great Britain qualified through England's performance in the World Cup (a procedure already successfully employed by Team GB in field hockey and rugby sevens), based on a format agreed by the four British football associations (England, Northern Ireland, Scotland, and Wales). Scotland also qualified for the World Cup but, under the agreement whereby the highest ranked home nation is nominated to compete for the purposes of Olympic qualification, their performance was not taken into account. Scotland players, along with Welsh and Northern Irish players, will be eligible for the Great Britain team in Tokyo.

Qualified UEFA teams

2020 CONCACAF Olympic Qualifying Championship

The United States and Canada qualified for Olympic by winning the semi-finals of the Olympic Qualifying Championship.

Group stage

Group A

Group B

Final stage

2020 CAF Olympic Qualifying Tournament

Zambia earned an Olympic qualification place by winning the qualifying tournament. Cameroon will advance to the playoff round against Chile, the second-place team from the CONMEBOL qualifying tournament.

Bracket

2020 AFC Olympic Qualifying Tournament

Australia and China qualified for Olympic by winning the play-off round of the Olympic Qualifying Tournament.

Qualified teams

First round
 Group A

 Group B

 Group C

 Group D

Second round
 Group A

 Group B

 Group C

Third round
 Group A

 Group B

Play-off round

CAF–CONMEBOL play-off

The Cameroon, the African runners-up, and Chile, the South American runners-up, will compete in a home-and-away two-legged play-off for a spot in the Olympics.

Notes

References

 
Women